The year 1932 in archaeology involved some significant events.

Explorations
  "Antro della Sibilla" cave discovered by Amedeo Maiuri in Italy.

Excavations
 Excavations of Antioch begun by an international committee (until 1939).
 The first organized excavations, to be pursued until 1942, are started in Classical Period Smyrna by Rudolf Naumann and Selahattin Kantar, after preliminary explorations made in 1927.
 Excavations of Troy begun by Carl Blegen (until 1938).
 Brattahlid, home of Erik the Red, is excavated by Danish archaeologists in southern Greenland.
 Clovis, New Mexico, excavations reveal the tools of the Clovis culture.
 Aage Roussell and Eigil Knuth excavate old Norse sites on the west Greenland coast.
 Excavation of a 'tumulus' in the grounds of Fawley Court in England proves it to have been created in 1731.

Publications
 William F. Albright - The Archaeology of Palestine and the Bible.
 R. G. Collingwood - Roman Britain.
 Cyril Fox - The Personality of Britain: its influence on inhabitant and invader in prehistoric and early historic times.
 Mary Hamilton Swindler becomes the first woman editor-in-chief of the American Journal of Archaeology

Finds
 November 22: Dura-Europos synagogue (244 CE) is discovered in Syria.
Baal with Thunderbolt or the "Baal stele" is excavated in Ugarit.
Parts of the western quay for the Diolkos in Greece are discovered by Harold North Fowler.

Awards

Miscellaneous
October: Secunda nave of the Nemi ships is recovered.

Births

 Patty Jo Watson, American archaeologist

Deaths

References

Archaeology
Archaeology
Archaeology by year